Teymuraz Gabashvili was the defending champion but decided not to participate.

Farrukh Dustov won the title, defeating Aslan Karatsev in the final, 7–6(7–4), 6–1.

Seeds

  Denis Istomin (second round)
  Damir Džumhur (second round)
  Gerald Melzer (semifinals)
  Farrukh Dustov (champion)
  Toni Androić (second round)
  Filip Peliwo (second round)
  Hans Podlipnik Castillo (first round)
  Gerard Granollers (withdrew/Non-appearance)
  Laurynas Grigelis (first round)

Draw

Finals

Top half

Bottom half
{{16TeamBracket-Compact-Tennis3-Byes 
| RD1=First round
| RD2=Second round
| RD3=Quarterfinals
| RD4=Semifinals

| RD1-seed01=5
| RD1-team01= T Androić
| RD1-score01-1=77
| RD1-score01-2=6
| RD1-score01-3=
| RD1-seed02=
| RD1-team02= Marc Rath
| RD1-score02-1=62
| RD1-score02-2=0
| RD1-score02-3=

| RD1-seed03= 
| RD1-team03= S Myneni
| RD1-score03-1=6
| RD1-score03-2=2
| RD1-score03-3=0
| RD1-seed04=Q
| RD1-team04=

References
 Main Draw
 Qualifying Draw

2014 ATP Challenger Tour
2014 Singles